The first series of Junior MasterChef Australia, the second spin off of the Australian reality television series MasterChef Australia, began on 12 September 2010 and aired on Network Ten. Matt Preston, George Calombaris and Gary Mehigan returned alongside new judge, Anna Gare.

The series finale was won by Isabella Bliss a 12-year-old girl from New South Wales.

Changes
In contrast to prior series, Junior MasterChef Australia is produced by Shine Australia. The series premiered on Sunday, 12 September 2010. It also added Anna Gare as fourth judge during individual challenges.

The series began with the Top 50 selected from the 5,500 applicants who auditioned for the show. The Top 50 featured five heats, with ten from the Top 50 who were best at the heat's team participating in each heat. Afterwards, the judges selected four to move forward to the Top 20. Furthermore, the Top 20 competed in two challenges to pick the Top 12. Contrast to other versions, contestants are not eliminated every week; rather, four are eliminated at every stage of the competition. Every eliminated contestant received a range of prizes, including those in the Top 50.

Contestants
The top 12 contestants were chosen throughout the first week of challenges amongst the Top 50 and the Top 20. The full group of 12 were all revealed on Sunday, 26 September 2010:

Notes:

 - Isabella and Sofia Bliss are fraternal twins.
 - Jack Lark was 12 years old during his audition for the show, the maximum age for the cooks who auditioned. Afterwards, he turned 13 during their first week in the MasterChef Kitchen.

Special guests
 Callum Hann - Top 20 Cooking Challenge
 Mark Jensen - MasterClass 1
 Poh Ling Yeow - MasterClass 1
 Donna Hay - Pressure Test 2 and Elimination Challenge 3
 John Lanzafáme - Elimination Challenge 1
 Justin North - Team Challenge 2
 Matt Moran - Team Challenge 2, MasterClass Réunion, and Elimination Challenge 3
 Jude Bolton - Team Challenge 3
 Adam Goodes - Team Challenge 3
 Luke Mangan - Team Challenge 3
 Stephanie Alexander - MasterClass 3 and MasterClass Réunion
 Peter Gilmore - Mystery Box 3
 Peter Kuruvita - Elimination Challenge 2
 Kylie Kwong - MasterClass Réunion
 Guillaume Brahimi - MasterClass Réunion
 Christine Manfield - MasterClass Réunion and Elimination Challenge 3
 Giovanni Pilu - MasterClass Réunion
 Shannon Bennett - Finale Night
 Adriano Zumbo - Finale Night

Episodes

Elimination Table

  Choose a Box Challenge was played as a Mystery Box variant. Sam was awarded one additional point for being most improved.
  Alex and Emily were awarded one additional point for being most improved.
  The Top 4 at this point (Sofia, Nick, Isabella and Pierre) were given a free pass to the Final 8.
  A Tag Team Challenge was played as a Team Challenge variant. Nick was awarded one point after being excused from the challenge as he was not feeling well.
  Nick and Pierre were awarded one point after being excused from the challenge as they were not feeling well.
  Nick was awarded one point after being excused from the challenge as he was not feeling well. Sofia had the highest score at this point and was given a free pass to the Final 4.
  Siena had the highest score at this point and was given a free pass to the Final 4.
  Isabella and Jack competed against each other in two rounds consisting of an Invention Test and a Pressure Test. Points would be earned for each test, with the winner decided based on the final tally after the two tests.

References

2010 Australian television seasons
MasterChef Australia